Nur Mohammad Dartakideh (also Romanized as Nūr Moḩammad Dartakīdeh) is a village in Pir Sohrab Rural District, in the Central District of Chabahar County, Sistan and Baluchestan Province, Iran. At the 2006 census, its population was 75, in 16 families.

References 

Populated places in Chabahar County